is a former Japanese professional baseball player and currently hitting coach for the Tokyo Yakult Swallows of the Nippon Professional Baseball (NPB). He played infielder for the Tokyo Yakult Swallows of the Nippon Professional Baseball (NPB).  Hatakeyama was the 2015 Central League leader in runs batted in, with 105. His retirement ceremony was conducted on September 21, 2019.

On September 13, 2019, he held press conference with Shohei Tateyama about his retirement.

References

External links

 NPB.com

1982 births
Living people
Asian Games bronze medalists for Japan
Asian Games medalists in baseball
Baseball players at the 2002 Asian Games
Japanese baseball coaches
Japanese baseball players
Medalists at the 2002 Asian Games
Nippon Professional Baseball coaches
Nippon Professional Baseball first basemen
Nippon Professional Baseball left fielders
Nippon Professional Baseball third basemen
People from Hanamaki, Iwate
Baseball people from Iwate Prefecture
Tokyo Yakult Swallows players
Yakult Swallows players